Segundo Cardona FAIA (born 1950) is a Puerto Rican architect and developer. His work has been recognized by the American Institute of Architects (AIA), by the Colegio de Arquitectos y Arquitectos Paisajistas de Puerto Rico (Puerto Rico College of Architects and Landscape Architects, or CAAPPR, for its acronym in Spanish) as well as by the International Union of Architects. In 2006 Cardona was elected as Fellow of the American Institute of Architects. In 1992, he was awarded the Henry Klumb Award.

Education and Career
Cardona entered the School of Architecture of the University of Puerto Rico and was a member of its first graduating class, obtaining a B.Arch in 1972. He was a design professor in the UPR (1974–1984) and was principal at Segundo Cardona Architects before co-founding in 1984 Sierra Cardona Ferrer (now known as SCF Architects) with partners Luis Sierra and Alberto Ferrer. He has remained active in academic and civic affairs. In addition to teaching architectural design at the University of Puerto Rico, Cardona has been a guest lecturer, visiting professor and juror at diverse institutions and universities including North Carolina State University School of Design, The Catholic University of America, The Contemporary Museum of Art in Puerto Rico, The Polytechnic University of Puerto Rico, and the Pontifical Catholic University of Puerto Rico School of Architecture. He is also a past president of the Puerto Rican Architects Association or Colegio de Arquitectos y Arquitectos Paisajistas de Puerto Rico (CAAPPR). In 2001, Cardona became a member of the Board of Trustees of the University of Puerto Rico, and was President of the Board from 2004 to 2007. An architectural monograph covering thirty-five years of his work was published in 2008. In 2013, Cardona won a competition to rebuild the Cathedral of Our Lady of the Assumption, Port-au-Prince, Haiti. In 2017, he participated in the UIA World Architects Congress in Seoul and received the Public Space Award for his design of the Paseo Puerta de Tierra, a promenade that connects two important tourist destinations in Puerto Rico.

Honors
HENRY KLUMB AWARD of the Colegio de Arquitectos y Arquitectos Paisajistas de Puerto Rico, 1992
FELLOW of the American Institute of Architects, Washington DC, USA, 2006

A selection of recent projects

Urban Hub at BPPR, San Juan (2018)
Universal Insurance Client Service Branch at Bayamón (2018)
Plaza Popular at BPPR, San Juan (2017)
Paseo Puerta de Tierra, San Juan (2017)
Universal Insurance Client Service Branch at Canóvanas (2013)
Lofthaus, San Juan (2013) 
Reconstruction of the Cathedral of Our Lady of the Assumption, Port-au-Prince, Haiti [unbuilt] (2012)
Library of the Supreme Court of Puerto Rico, San Juan (2011)
BPPR Popular Center Expansion, Phase II, San Juan (2011)  ( BAQ 2010)
Pontifical Catholic University of Puerto Rico School of Architecture, Forteza Historic Building, Ponce (2010) 
Universal Insurance Client Service Branch at Caguas (2009)

Other significant projects

V. Suárez & Co. Headquarters and Warehouse ∙ Atlantic Commercial Park, Bayamón (2008)
Condominio Luchetti 1212, San Juan
Mennonite General Hospital, Cayey
BPPR Popular Center Expansion Phase I, San Juan
Quantum Metro Center Residential Towers, San Juan 
Coliseo de Puerto Rico, San Juan (2004)
Tren Urbano Stations: Hato Rey (Tren Urbano station), Cupey, Centro Médico, San Francisco, Las Lomas, Martínez Nadal, Torrimar, Jardines; San Juan (2004)(Tren Urbano de San Juan)
The Corporate Center at Roosevelt Avenue, San Juan
Doral Financial Headquarters, San Juan 
Universal Insurance Headquarters, Guaynabo
Plaza Athenee Condominium, Guaynabo
Expansion to the Law School ∙ Universidad de Puerto Rico, Río Piedras
Paseo del Parque: Centro de Gobierno y Biblioteca Municipal, Bayamón
Smithsonian ∙ Centro de Investigaciones Marinas, Panamá [unbuilt]
Biblioteca UPRB, Universidad de Puerto Rico, Bayamón 
Air Traffic Control Tower at Luis Muñoz Marín International Airport, Carolina
El Portal Rainforest Center at El Yunque National Forest, Río Grande
AT&T Wireless ∙ Cingular (Cellular One), Guaynabo
Casa Miramar [Casa Felices], San Juan
Pabellón Nacional de Puerto Rico en la Expo ‘92, Sevilla 
Villa Las Brisas ∙ Cluster 4 Río Mar, Río Grande
Puerto Rico Telephone Company Headquarters, San Juan
Edificio de Oficinas SCF/LIH, Guaynabo
Casa Villa Caparra, Guaynabo
Guardian Insurance Building, St. Thomas, USVI
Centro Judicial de Carolina, Carolina
Instituto San Pablo ∙ Hospital San Pablo, Bayamón
La Bodega ∙ Méndez & Co., Guaynabo
Fundación Luis Muñoz Marín, Trujillo Alto (1987)
Condominio Caparra Classic, Guaynabo
Banco de Boston: Sucursal Mínima, Carolina (1986)
Oficinas Ejecutivas ∙ Puerto Rico Telephone Company Fase II, San Juan (1985)
Citibank: Mini-sucursal, Arecibo (1985)
Citibank Miami, Miami, FL (1983)
Piscina Municipal de Adjuntas, Adjuntas (1980)
Casa de Acero [Casa Cardona], Río Piedras (1980)
Centro de Servicios Múltiples de Hato Tejas, Bayamón (1980)
Estación Postal de Quebradillas, Quebradillas (1978)
Casa de la Punta (Casa Ferrer), Dorado (1978) 
Hato Rey Centro, Hato Rey (1978)
Biblioteca General Pública de Puerto Rico, San Juan [unbuilt] (1978)
Santuario a la Virgen de la Providencia, San Juan [unbuilt] (1978)
Torre San Pablo ∙ Hospital San Pablo, Bayamón (1977)
Casa Segarra, Guaynabo (1976)
Condominio Park Gardens, Río Piedras (1975)
Communications Building, Puerto Rico Telephone Company Phase I, San Juan (1975)
Casa Marín · Charneco, Urbanización La Campiña (1974)
Casa Colom · Báez, Mayagüez (1973)
Casa Cardona · Colom, Toa Alta (1972)

Project list sources

Project Awards and Recognitions

2017
Medal Winner · Public Space, “Friendly and Inclusive Spaces 2017” Worldwide Competition by the International Union of Architects (UIA): Paseo Puerta de Tierra
Honor Award, AIA Florida/Caribbean: Paseo Puerta de Tierra
Outstanding Work, Colegio de Ingenieros y Agrimensores de Puerto Rico, Paseo Puerta de Tierra
2014
Nomination to MCHAP (Mies Crown Hall Americas Prize): Puerto Rico Supreme Court Library by Council of MCHAP Nominators, Chicago, Illinois.
2013
Honor Award, Commercial Category · XXII Cemex Building Award · Puerto Rico Edition: Lofthaus, San Juan
Honor Award, AIA Puerto Rico: Universal Insurance · Client Service Branch, Canóvanas
Honor Mention, XIII Bienal CAAPPR: Universal Insurance · Client Service Branch, Canóvanas
2012		
XXI Cemex Building Award, Residential Category · Puerto Rico Edition: Quantum Metro Center
XXI Cemex Building Award, Institutional Category · Puerto Rico Edition: Library of the Supreme Court of Puerto Rico
First Place, Competition for the Cathedral of Our Lady of the Assumption, Port-au-Prince, Haiti
2011		
XX Cemex Building Award, Institutional Category · Puerto Rico Edition: Library of the Supreme Court of Puerto Rico
XII Bienal CAAPPR, Honor Award: Library of the Supreme Court of Puerto Rico
Merit Award, AIA Puerto Rico: Library of the Supreme Court of Puerto Rico
2010
Honor Mention, AIA Puerto Rico: School of Architecture, Pontifical Catholic University of Puerto Rico
2009
XVIII Cemex Building Award, Industrial Category · Puerto Rico Edition: V. Suárez Atlantic Commercial Park
MetalMag Award 2nd Place, Metal Construction: V. Suárez Atlantic Commercial Park
2008
XVII Cemex Building Award · Puerto Rico Edition, Residential, Second Place: Luchetti 1212, San Juan
XVII Cemex Building Award · Puerto Rico Edition, Commercial/Industrial, Second Place: Universal Group: Client Service Branch, Mayagüez
Prime Site Award, Facilities Media Group: Coliseo de Puerto Rico
2007
XVI Cemex Building Award · Puerto Rico Edition, Commercial/Industrial: BPPR Altamira Office and Parking Building
VI FCAA Bienal: Honor Mention to Segundo Cardona for his outstanding work and contributions to Caribbean Architecture
Prime Site Award 2007, Facilities Media Group: Coliseo de Puerto Rico
2006
Test of Time Award, AIA Puerto Rico Chapter: House at Breñas Point (aka Casa de la Punta or Casa Ferrer)
Honor Award URBE: SCF Arquitectos, Award to architectural practice committed to good architecture and a livable city
International Large Venue of the Year, Pollstar Awards: Coliseo de Puerto Rico
Project of the Year, Mortgage Bankers Association: La Cima de Torrimar
XV Cemex Building Award · Puerto Rico Edition, First Place in Institucional: Coliseo de Puerto Rico
XV Cemex Building Award · Puerto Rico Edition, First Place in Residential: La Cima de Torrimar
XV Cemex Building Award · Puerto Rico Edition, Honor Mention: Tren Urbano Stations: Hato Rey, Cupey, Centro Médico y Jardines, San Juan
XV Cemex Building Award · International Edition, Third Place in Institutional Category: Coliseo de Puerto Rico
2004
Third Place, Concurso de Diseño Nueva Vivienda para Puerto Rico, Departamento de la Vivienda
2003
Honor Mention, AIA Puerto Rico: Banco Popular Center, Expansion and Remodeling
2002
Honor Mention, AIA Puerto Rico: Doral Financial
2001
Honor Award, VI Bienal de Arquitectura: Law School Expansion, Universidad de Puerto Rico
1999
National Architecture Prize, V Bienal de Arquitectura, CAAPPR: Biblioteca CUTB
First Prize, V Bienal de Arquitectura, CAAPPR: Centro de Gobierno de Bayamón
1998
Excellence in Design Award, AIA Florida: Biblioteca CUTB
Honor Award, Premio URBE: Hospital Menonita, Cayey
1996
Honor Award, Premio URBE: El Portal de El Yunque: Centro de Visitantes de El Yunque, Bosque Tropical del Caribe 
Honor Award, AIA: Biblioteca, Colegio Universitario Tecnológico de Bayamón (CUTB)
Honor Award, Premio URBE: Biblioteca CUTB, Bayamón
1994
Honor Award, Premio URBE: Biblioteca Carnegie
Honor Award, Premio URBE: Torre de Control, Aeropuerto Internacional Luis Muñoz Marín
1993
Honor Award, Work in Concrete, Asociación de Hormigoneras Premezclado de Puerto Rico: Villa Las Brisas, Río Mar, Río Grande
1992
Honor Award, Premio URBE: Las Vistas Shopping Village
Honor Award, AIA, Región de Florida: Pabellón Nacional de Puerto Rico, Exposición Universal, Sevilla, España
1991
Honor Award, Premio URBE: Fundación Luis Muñoz Marín 
Mención, Premio URBE: Residencia Miguel Ferrer, Guaynabo
1989
Mención de Honor, AIA: Fundación Luis Muñoz Marín, Trujillo Alto
1987
Puerto Rico Overall Outstanding Project, Colegio de Ingenieros & Agrimensores: Centro Judicial de Carolina, Carolina
1986
Mention, AIA Puerto Rico: Banco Nacional de Puerto Rico, Hato Rey
Honor Award, Excellence in Design, AIA Puerto Rico: Mini Sucursal Citibank, Arecibo
Honor Award, Excellence in Design, AIA Florida: Mini Sucursal Citibank, Arecibo
1984
Merit Citation, AIA Puerto Rico: Parque para Niños Impedidos, Guaynabo
1983
First Place, Design Competition: Parking Building and Plaza for the Faculty of the Medical Sciences School, University of Puerto Rico
1982
Merit Citation, Excellence in Architectural Design, AIA Puerto Rico: El Vedado Townhouses, Hato Rey
Honor Award, Excellence in Architectural Design, AIA Puerto Rico: Residencia Cardona-Alvarez (Casa de Acero)
1980
Honor Award, Excellence in Architectural Design, AIA Puerto Rico: Adjuntas Municipal Pool
1978
Honor Award, Excellence in Architectural Design, AIA Puerto Rico: Quebradillas USPS Postal Office Building
First Place in Design Competition, Hato Tejas Diagnostic and Treatment Center
First Place in Design Competition: Santuario de la Virgen de la Providencia, Nuevo Centro de San Juan
1977
Merit Citation, Excellence in Architectural Design, AIA Puerto Rico: Park Gardens Condominium

Award sources

See also

 List of people from Puerto Rico
 List of Puerto Rican architects
 Architecture of Puerto Rico

References

External links

 SCF Arquitectos website
 Location of works on Google Maps

Links to selected videos
 Interview by Ing. Carlos Pesquera, ElJunte.com 
 Lecture at ArqPoli / the School of Architecture of the Polytechnic University of Puerto Rico 
 Una Nueva Catedral para Haití, Lecture at Caribbean Studies Institute (Instituto de Estudios del Caribe)
 Cardona shares his views on the design of the reconstruction of the Cathedral of Our Lady of the Assumption, Port-au-Prince Cathedral at the Pontificial Catholic University of Puerto Rico 
 Winning Competition Designs for Rebuilding the Notre Dame de l’Assomption Cathedral, Port-au-Prince, Haiti at the University of Miami – School of Architecture 
 Arquitectura de Puerto Rico: Coliseo de Puerto Rico

1950 births
Fellows of the American Institute of Architects
Living people
University of Puerto Rico alumni
People from San Juan, Puerto Rico
Puerto Rican architects
Modernist architecture in Puerto Rico
Urban designers